Taylor Benjamin (born March 27, 1990) is a Canadian-born Guyanese former footballer and was a member of the Guyanese national football team.

Career

College and Amateur
Born in Etobicoke, Ontario, Canada, Benjamin attended Woodroffe High School in Ottawa, Ontario, played youth soccer with Ottawa Royals S.C. and FC Outaouais. He played one year of OCAA soccer at Algonquin College. After one season, he moved to Limeira, Brazil to play for Associação Atlética Internacional.

Professional
Benjamin signed his first professional contract when he signed for Capital City F.C. in the Canadian Soccer League (CSL) on May 18, 2011. He made his professional debut on 20 May 2011, in a 2–0 loss to Toronto Croatia. In 2013, he signed with Kingston FC, and assisted in securing the First Division title. He featured in the CSL Championship finals with Kingston, but fell short after losing to SC Waterloo Region. In 2014, he played abroad in the TT Pro League with Morvant Caledonia United, and later was transferred to North East Stars.

In 2015, he returned to the CSL to play with London City. For the remainder of the season he played abroad in the Landesliga Bayern-Mitte with SV Fortuna Regensburg. He had a brief stint in the A-Klasse Bogen to play with SG Bogen. In 2016, he played in the Bayernliga Süd with TSV Bogen. He returned to the Landesliga Bayern-Mitte to sign with SV Neukirchen Hl. Blut for the remainder of the 2016–17 season. In 2017, he returned to play with SV Fortuna Regensburg.

International
On November 11, 2011, Benjamin was called up to Guyana for their 2014 FIFA World Cup qualifiers against Trinidad & Tobago. He made his international debut in the return-leg against Trinidad at Hasely Crawford Stadium on November 15, 2011.

Honors 
Kingston
 Canadian Soccer League First Division: 2013

References

External links
 CSL player profile

1990 births
Living people
Soccer players from Toronto
Sportspeople from Etobicoke
Canadian Soccer League (1998–present) players
Kingston FC players
London City players
Morvant Caledonia United players
North East Stars F.C. players
TT Pro League players
Canadian soccer players
Guyanese footballers
Guyana international footballers
Association football defenders
Canadian sportspeople of Guyanese descent
Black Canadian soccer players